Lussat may refer to the following places in France:

 Lussat, Creuse, a commune in the Creuse department
 Lussat, Puy-de-Dôme, a commune in the Puy-de-Dôme department